Dangi-ye Ali Beyg (also Romanized as Dangī-ye ‘Alī Beyg; also known as Dangī-ye ‘Alī Beg and Dengī-ye ‘Alībag) is a village in Posht Tang Rural District, in the Central District of Sarpol-e Zahab County, Kermanshah Province, Iran. At the 2006 census, its population was 131, in 22 families.

References 

Populated places in Sarpol-e Zahab County